Galesh Gacheh (also Romanized as Gālesh Gācheh) is a village in Pir Bazar Rural District, in the Central District of Rasht County, Gilan Province, Iran. At the 2006 census, its population was 159, in 40 families.

References 

Populated places in Rasht County